Yeshivat Birkat Moshe is a hesder yeshiva located in the Mitzpeh Nevo neighborhood of Ma'ale Adumim in the West Bank. It was founded in 1977 by Rabbis Haim Sabato and Yitzchak Sheilat, then two young rabbis from Yeshivat HaKotel, in Jerusalem.

For the first nine years since its inception it was situated in temporary structures the Maale Adumim's industrial zone Mishor Adumim, before moving to its current campus and location in Mitzpeh Nevo. Due to the founder rabbis' young age at the time, they refused the title rosh yeshiva; and so in 1983, they were joined by Rabbi Nahum Rabinovich Zt”l, who has acted as the rosh yeshiva until his petira on May 6, 2020.

The Yeshiva is known for its style of learning, which emphasizes at one and the same time the precise and incisive analysis of written text, particularly the Talmud and the Rambam, as well as the quest for common-sense understanding of the logic of the sages and its reflection in halacha.  Rabbi Haim Sabato teaches the introductory class for first-year students, in which he emphasizes the skill of precise and perceptive reading of text.  More advanced students used to learn from Rabbi Rabinovitch when he was alive, to study the Rambam with care and precision. The yeshiva encourages advanced students undertake independent scholarly work, such as Rabbi Baruch Brener's edition of the commentary of the Malbim on Torah or Rabbi Yehuda Fris' comprehensive guide to family law, which follows the halachic tradition up to and including current practice in Israel's rabbinical courts.

The Yeshiva teaches all its students that a primary quality of a talmid chacham is to take personal responsibility, for his learning, for his lifestyle, and for decisions he must take on behalf of others.  One must learn enough to acquire the ability to take decisions independently (as well as to know when one must consult with those wiser and more knowledgeable than oneself).  Taking responsibility, and not habituating oneself to psychological dependence on others, is one's duty before Heaven.  This point of view is controversial in today's yeshiva world, but the leaders of Birkat Moshe accept responsibility for it.

Other prominent personalities in the Yeshiva are Rabbi Elisha Aviner, head of the advanced study section which prepares students for the Israeli Rabbinate's ordination exams, Rabbi Eliahu Lifshitz who specializes in the analytical works of Aharonim, and Rabbi Tzvi Shimshoni, who undertook a special study of the laws concerning interest in contemporary society.

The Yeshiva is known for its emphasis on the Rambam, which is very much in line with the late rosh yeshiva'''s personal studies; he was the author of a comprehensive commentary and elucidation of the Rambam's major work the Mishne Torah, called Yad Peshuta.

The yeshiva has a wide range of students; due to its wide range of rabbis from within the Religious Zionist community, and its wide curriculum in Jewish studies: Tanakh and philosophy as well as Gemara.

Rabbi Sabato is a noted Israeli novelist, whose book Te'um Kavvanot'' ("Adjusting Sights"), an autobiographical account of the Yom Kippur War written in lyrical Hebrew that recalls the style of S. Y. Agnon, won the Sapir Prize for modern Hebrew literature.

Today the Yeshiva has approximately 300 students and 2,000 alumni.

External links
Official website 
Official website 
Yeshivat Birkat Moshe, (Video )

Birkat Moshe
Yeshivas in the West Bank
Educational institutions established in 1977
1977 establishments in the Israeli Military Governorate